Guido Bodrato (born 27 March 1933) is an Italian politician.

Biography
Bodrato was born in Monteu Roero, in Piedmont, and graduated in jurisprudence. He entered Christian Democracy (Democrazia Cristiana, or DC) and was elected in the Italian Chamber of Deputies for that party from 1968 to 1994. He was also municipal councillor in Turin. Together with Carlo Donat-Cattin, he was a leader of DC's Forze Nuove internal wing (a left wing), and later, as a collaborator of Benigno Zaccagnini, a founder of the so-called Area Zac with Mino Martinazzoli and others.

Bodrato was Minister of Education from 1980 and 1982 (Forlani and Spadolini I/II cabinets), then, in 1982-1983, Minister of Economic Balance in the Fanfani V cabinet. After a period as DC's vice-secretary under Ciriaco De Mita and then Arnaldo Forlani, he was again minister, this time of Industry and Commerce, in 1991-1992 (Andreotti VII Cabinet).

During the Mani Pulite scandal that wiped out DC and other Italian traditional government parties, he supported the renovation of new secretary Mino Martinazzoli, and the foundation of the new Italian People's Party (Partito Popolare Italiano, PPI). From 1996 to 1999 he was director of the party's newspaper Il Popolo. Bodrato was elected in the PPI's lists at the European Parliament in 1999-2004.

External links
Biography at Piedmontese PPI website 
Photo archive at L'Unità website

1933 births
Living people
People from the Province of Cuneo
Christian Democracy (Italy) politicians
Italian People's Party (1994) politicians
Democracy is Freedom – The Daisy politicians
20th-century Italian politicians
21st-century Italian politicians
University of Turin alumni